Tunjščica Creek (also known locally as Tunjica Creek) is a left tributary of the Pšata River in Slovenia. It flows past or through Sidraž, Laniše, Tunjice, Tunjiška Mlaka, and Gora pri Komendi before emptying into the Pšata at Moste. Tributaries of Tunjščica Creek include Praproščica Creek (a.k.a. Prapretčica Creek).

References

External links
Tunjščica Creek on Geopedia 

Bodies of water of Upper Carniola